In baseball statistics, an error is an act, in the judgment of the official scorer, of a fielder misplaying a ball in a manner that allows a batter or baserunner to advance one or more bases or allows an at bat to continue after the batter should have been put out. First base, or 1B, is the first of four stations on a baseball diamond which must be touched in succession by a baserunner to score a run for that player's team. A first baseman is the player on the team playing defense who fields the area nearest first base, and is responsible for the majority of plays made at that base. In the numbering system used to record defensive plays, the first baseman is assigned the number 3.

The list of career leaders is dominated by players from the 19th century when fielding equipment was very rudimentary; baseball gloves only began to steadily gain acceptance in the 1880s, and were not uniformly worn until the mid-1890s, resulting in a much lower frequency of defensive miscues. Additional modifications were made to first basemen's gloves in the 1930s which further reduced errors. All but one of the top 14 players in career errors began playing in the 19th century, and most played their entire careers before 1900; none were active after 1919. None of the top 20 were active after 1930, and only 10 of the top 64 were active after 1950. The top 48 single-season totals were all recorded before 1900, and the top 179 were recorded before 1920. To a large extent, the leaders reflect longevity rather than lower skill. George Sisler, whose 269 errors are the most by any first baseman whose career began after 1910, is often regarded as the greatest defensive first baseman in history; George Scott, whose 165 errors are the most by an American League first baseman since the Gold Glove Awards for fielding excellence were introduced in 1957, won the award eight times – including 1967, when he led the AL with 19 errors.

Cap Anson, whose career began in 1871 and who played nearly 400 more games at first base than any other player in the 19th century, is the all-time leader in career errors as a first baseman with 658, nearly three times as many as any first baseman whose career began after 1920; he also holds the National League record of 583. Dan Brouthers, who played only one game at first base after 1896, is second all-time with 513, and is the only other first baseman to commit more than 500 errors.

Key

List

Stats updated through the 2022 season

Other Hall of Famers

Notes

References

Baseball-Reference.com

Major League Baseball statistics
Major League Baseball lists